Dehme is a village in the town of Bad Oeynhausen in the District Minden-Lübbecke, Regierungsbezirk Detmold.

The village is located at the south side of the Wiehen Hills and the west bank of the river Weser.

The first written mention of Dehme is from Bishop Benno II. from Osnabrück in his testament in the year 1088.

The  is based in the former brickworks which closed lower 1984th.

Minden-Lübbecke